The Box may refer to:

Arts, entertainment, and media

Films 
 The Box (1967 film), a 1967 Oscar-winning short animation by Fred Wolf
 The Box (1975 film), an Australian film based on the TV series of the same name
 The Box (2003 film), starring James Russo
 The Box (2007 film), starring Gabrielle Union
 The Box (2009 film), directed by Richard Kelly, starring Cameron Diaz
 The Box (2021 film), directed by Sasha Sibley, starring Graham Jenkins
 The Box (2021 South Korean film), a South Korean film starring Park Chanyeol
 The Box (2021 Venezuelan film), directed by Lorenzo Vigas, starring Hernán Mendoza, released in Mexico

Literature
 The Box (Grass book), autobiography of Günter Grass
 The Box (Levinson book), nonfiction book by Marc Levinson
 The Box, a graphic novel by Joshua Starnes and Raymond Estrada

Music 
 The Box (band), a new wave group from Montreal, Canada

Albums
 The Box (Chicago album), a box set by Chicago
 The Box (Van der Graaf Generator album), a box set by Van der Graaf Generator

Songs
 "The Box" (King Missile song), 1988
 "The Box" (Orbital song), 1996
 "The Box" (Randy Travis song), 1995
 "The Box" (Roddy Ricch song), 2019
 "The Box", a song from Johnny Flynn's 2008 album, A Larum
 "The Box", the opening track from Annihilator's 1994 studio album King of the Kill
 "The Box", a song by Fad Gadget, 1979
 "The Box", a song by Snot from the album Get Some, 1997

Television

Channels
 The Box (Dutch TV channel), a defunct Dutch music channel that aired between 1995 and 2006
 The Box Comedy, a temporary Dutch comedy television channel for the transition of The Box (Dutch TV channel) to Comedy Central (Dutch TV channel)
 The Box (British TV channel), a music video channel formerly known as Video Jukebox Network
 The Box (U.S. TV channel), a defunct U.S. music video channel
 The BOX (New Zealand), a television channel in New Zealand

Series
 The Box (game show), a 2015 British cookery game show
 The Box (Irish TV series), an Irish quiz show presented by Keith Duffy
 The Box (Australian TV series), a 1970s Australian soap opera

Episodes
 "The Box" (Brooklyn Nine-Nine), a critically acclaimed season 5 episode of Brooklyn Nine-Nine
 "The Box" (Fringe), a 2010 episode of the television series Fringe
 "The Box" (Rugrats episode), a 1993 episode of Rugrats
 "The Box", a season 5 episode of The Amazing World Of Gumball
 "The Box", an episode of Star Wars: The Clone Wars
 "The Box", an episode of Recess

Other uses in arts, entertainment, and media
 The Box (band), a 1980s Canadian New Wave group
 The Box (radio program), a weekly talk-radio program
 The Box, a custom-built steel guitar played by Paul Franklin
 The box or squawk box, British and American slang, respectively, for a television set

Places
The Box, Plymouth, a museum and art gallery
 The Box, a nickname for Area 51
 The Box, a narrow, high-walled part of the North Kaibab Trail in the Grand Canyon
 The Box Soho, an X-rated club in Soho, London, and sister club to the Manhattan club

See also 
 Box (disambiguation)
 "Thinking outside the box", an expression meaning "thinking unconventionally"